Lieutenant-General Sir John Norman Stewart Arthur, KCB, CVO (born 6 March 1931) was General Officer Commanding in Scotland.

Military career
Educated at Eton College and the Royal Military Academy, Sandhurst, Arthur was commissioned into the Royal Scots Greys in 1951. At the 1960 Summer Olympics in Rome he was part of the British equestrian team for the three-day event; he withdrew after the cross-country phase.

He was appointed Commanding Officer of the Royal Scots Dragoon Guards in 1972 and mentioned in despatches for service in Northern Ireland in 1974 during The Troubles. He became Commander of 7th Armoured Brigade in 1976.

He went on to be General Officer Commanding 3rd Armoured Division in 1980 and Director of Personal Services (Army) in 1983. He was given the colonelcy of the Royal Scots Dragoon Guards in 1984, a position he held until 1998. He was appointed General Officer Commanding Scotland and Governor of Edinburgh Castle in 1985; he retired in 1988.

In 1996 he became Lord Lieutenant of the Stewartry of Kirkcudbright, Dumfries and Galloway Region, and held this post until succeeded by Malcolm Ross in March 2006.

Family
In 1960 he married Theresa Mary Hopkinson; they went on to have two sons (one of whom died) and a daughter.
He married again in 2012 to Jillian Andrews.

References

|-

|-

1931 births
Living people
People educated at Eton College
Royal Scots Greys officers
Royal Scots Dragoon Guards officers
British Army lieutenant generals
Knights Commander of the Order of the Bath
Commanders of the Royal Victorian Order
British event riders
Olympic equestrians of Great Britain
British male equestrians
Equestrians at the 1960 Summer Olympics
Graduates of the Royal Military Academy Sandhurst
Lord-Lieutenants of Kirkcudbright
British military personnel of The Troubles (Northern Ireland)